Ricky Bell may refer to:
Ricky Bell (running back) (1955–1984), National Football League running back
Ricky Bell (cornerback) (1974–2011), Canadian Football League cornerback
Ricky Bell (singer) (born 1967), R&B singer for New Edition and Bell Biv DeVoe

See also
Richard Bell (disambiguation)